Argiope mascordi is a species of orb-web spider found in Queensland, Australia. The females of this species are smaller and less colourful than many other spiders in the genus Argiope.  Males are larger than many other Argiope.  Web decorations in this species are interesting in that A. mascordi juveniles construct a cross and adults construct a disc. The reason for this apparent reversal in decorating behaviour remains unknown.

Gallery

References

mascordi
Spiders of Australia
Spiders described in 1983